Fred Stolle was the defending champion, but did not participate this year.

Rod Laver won the singles title at the 1970 Queen's Club Championships tennis tournament, defeating countryman John Newcombe 6–4, 6–3 in the final.

Seeds

  Rod Laver (champion)
  John Newcombe (final)
  Tom Okker (second round)
  Roger Taylor (second round)
  Marty Riessen (semifinals)
  Dennis Ralston (third round)
  Clark Graebner (second round)
  Manuel Orantes (second round)

Draw

Finals

Top half

Section 1

Section 2

Bottom half

Section 3

Section 4

External links
 Main draw

1970 Queen's Club Championships